Cuarteron Reef, also known as Calderon Reef (Mandarin ; ; ; Calderon Reef), is a reef at the east end of the London Reefs in the Spratly Islands of the South China Sea. It is occupied and controlled by China (PRC) (as part of Sansha), and also claimed by the Philippines (as part of Kalayaan), by Vietnam (as part of Truong Sa) and Taiwan (ROC).

Geographical features
On 12 July 2016, the tribunal of the Permanent Court of Arbitration concluded that Cuarteron Reef contains, within the meaning of Article 121(1) of the Convention, naturally formed areas of land, surrounded by water, which are above water at high tide. However, for purposes of Article 121(3) of the convention, the high-tide features at Cuarteron Reef is  rocks that cannot sustain human habitation or economic life of their own and accordingly shall be entitled to 12nmi of territorial sea measured from its baseline but have no exclusive economic zone or continental shelf.

Chinese construction projects
Prior to 2016, Carteron reef had a supply platform and a reef fortress. In 2015 the Philippine government released what it claimed were photos of a six-story facility being built by the Chinese government on the reef. As of 2016, China was reportedly building a high-power radar installation on the reef.

In late 2016, photographs emerged which suggested that Cuarteron Reef has been armed with anti-aircraft weapons and a CIWS missile-defence system.

See also 
 Great wall of sand
 Nine-Dash Line

References

External links

 Asia Maritime Transparency Initiative Island Tracker

Reefs of the Spratly Islands
London Reefs
Artificial islands of Asia